The Classic Grand Besançon Doubs is a one-day road cycling race in September in the region of Doubs, France. It is on the UCI Europe Tour calendar as a 1.1 rated event.

Winners

References

External links
Official site 

UCI Europe Tour races
Cycle races in France
Recurring sporting events established in 2021
2021 establishments in France